Kheow Sundarakul na Jolburi (complete title Chao Chom Manda Kheow Sundarakul na Jolburi, Royal Concubine of King Nangklao "Rama III" of Siam), was a daughter of His Highness Prince Reuang, the Prince Sundarabhubet(), but she did not inherit a title of princess from her prince father.

She moved to the Grand Palace to be a royal Concubine of King Nangklao with  the royal title Chao Chom (Royal Concubine). She gave birth to a prince and a princess.

See also 
 Sundarakul na Jolburi

References
 พระราชประวัติพระบาทสมเด็จพระนั่งเกล้าเจ้าอยู่หัว และพระราชสกุล กระทู้ในพันทิป.คอม - Biography of King Rama and Rachskul, topicstock.pantip.com. (in Thai)
 ราชสกุลในพระบาทสมเด็จพระนั่งเกล้าเจ้าอยู่หัว - Biography of King Rama I  and Rachskul, bloggang.com (in Thai)

Year of birth missing
Year of death missing
Kheow Sundarakul na Jolburi
Kheow Sundarakul na Jolburi
19th-century Chakri dynasty